Guardian Capital Group, founded in 1962, operates several fully owned subsidiaries whose operations are to provide investment management services, financial advisory services, retail distribution of mutual funds, insurance, and general corporate services. Guardian Capital Group is headquartered in Toronto, Ontario, Canada, and became publicly listed on the Toronto Stock Exchange in 1969. As of December 31, 2015, the company has $24.2 billion in assets under management.

History 
In May 2001, Guardian Capital Group sold a portion of its retail mutual fund business with roughly $2 billion in assets under management to the Bank of Montreal in exchange for 4.96 million common shares, worth roughly $180 million. Guardian Capital LP, one of Canada's largest investment management firms and a subsidiary of Guardian Capital Group, actively manages many of BMO's mutual fund products.

In January 2011, George Mavroudis was appointed President of Guardian Capital Group after the passing of John Christodoulou. Mavroudis has been with the company since 2005 in the position of Senior Vice-President, Strategic Planning and Development. Prior to joining Guardian Capital Group, Mavroudis held previous appointments as a Managing Director with J.P. Morgan Asset Management in its London, New York City, Moscow, and Toronto offices.

In June of 2022, Guardian Capital Group purchased a 60% stake in Rae & Lipskie Investment Counsel Inc., an Ontario-based private wealth management firm.

Key subsidiaries 
 Guardian Capital LP - Investment management firm for institutional and retail clients.
 Guardian Capital Advisors - Investment management firm for high-net-worth individuals.
 Worldsource Wealth Management - Financial advisory firm, Mutual fund brokerage, securities brokerage, and Insurance carrier.
 Alexandria Bancorp Ltd. - Fully licensed bank located in the Cayman Islands and Barbados providing corporate governance advisory, investment management, and banking services.

See also
 List of asset management firms
 List of mutual-fund families in Canada

References

External links 
 Guardian Capital Group Company Website
Guardian Capital Group on Google Finance
 

Companies based in Toronto
Companies listed on the Toronto Stock Exchange
Financial services companies established in 1962
1962 establishments in Ontario
Canadian companies established in 1962